Fernando Báez may refer to:

Fernando Báez (writer), Venezuelan writer, poet and essayist
Fernando Báez (weightlifter) (born 1941), Puerto Rican weightlifter
Fernando Báez (2001–2020), Argentine citizen murdered in Buenos Aires Province